Fomitopsis palustris is a species of polypore fungus in the family Fomitopsidaceae. It causes brown rot, a disease of wood that results from the enzymatic breakdown of the wood component cellulose, but not lignin. Several enzymes involved in the wood-decay process have been biochemically characterized. The whole genome sequence of F. palustris was reported in 2017.

Wood decay enzymes
Fomitopsis palustris is known to possess three different cellulase enzymes.

An endoglucanase, named EG-II, has been purified and characterized from this species in 2008; it is believed to assist in the wood rot process by loosening the polysaccharide network in cell walls by disentangling hemicelluloses associated with cellulose.

References

Fungi described in 1872
Fungal tree pathogens and diseases
palustris
Taxa named by Miles Joseph Berkeley